Markus Ziereis (born 26 August 1992) is a German professional footballer who plays as a forward for SpVgg Bayreuth.

Club career
Ziereis began his career with TSV 1860 Munich and made his 2. Bundesliga debut for the club in November 2012, as a half-time substitute for Sebastian Maier in a 2–2 draw with 1. FC Union Berlin. In 2013, he joined FSV Frankfurt. In order to get more playing time, he was loaned to SV Darmstadt 98. In 2014, he joined Chemnitzer FC.

After one season, he returned to SSV Jahn Regensburg. During the 2015–16 season he contributed 19 goals in 31 league matches to Regensburg's promotion from the Regionalliga Bayern to the 3. Liga. His following season was blighted by injuries and he lost his place in the starting lineup, making just 10 substitute appearances.

On 10 August 2017, Ziereis returned to 1860 Munich, thereby moving two tiers down, leaving newly promoted 2. Bundesliga club Regensburg to play in the Regionalliga Bayern.

He joined SpVgg Bayreuth in June 2020.

International career
In 2007 and 2008, Ziereis earned five caps for the Germany under-16 national team.

Personal life
Ziereis is best friends with Kevin Volland. The duo shared a flat while playing together at TSV 1860 Munich as they both played for Bavarian Football Association youth teams. Volland was also witness when Ziereis married Evi Reiter on 28 December 2018.

Career statistics

Club

Honours
SpVgg Bayreuth
 Regionalliga Bayern: 2021–22

References

External links
 

1992 births
Living people
Association football forwards
German footballers
TSV 1860 Munich II players
TSV 1860 Munich players
FSV Frankfurt players
SV Darmstadt 98 players
Chemnitzer FC players
SSV Jahn Regensburg players
2. Bundesliga players
3. Liga players
Regionalliga players
Germany youth international footballers
People from Cham (district)
Sportspeople from the Upper Palatinate
Footballers from Bavaria